"Hello Hi" is the debut single by Swedish girl group Dolly Style. The song was taken part in Melodifestivalen 2015 and qualified to Andra Chansen (Second Chance) through the first semi-final on 7 February 2015, but failed to make it to the Melodifestivalen final.

Charts

Certifications

References

2015 songs
2015 singles
Melodifestivalen songs of 2015
English-language Swedish songs
Songs written by Jimmy Jansson
Capitol Records singles
Dolly Style songs